"Lay Me Down" is a song by English singer Sam Smith, released on 15 February 2013 as the lead single from their debut studio album In the Lonely Hour (2014). It originally peaked at number 46 on the UK Singles Chart and at number 25 on the US Bubbling Under Hot 100 Singles chart in 2014. The song was written by Smith, Jimmy Napes and Elviin and produced by Napes and Steve Fitzmaurice.

The song was re-released in February 2015 as the sixth single from the album, this time reaching number 8 on the US Billboard Hot 100 and number 15 on the UK Singles Chart. A third version featuring John Legend recorded for the British charity telethon Comic Relief reached number one in the UK in March 2015.

Music video
The original music video showed Smith and their friends at a casino. Following the announcement of the re-release, it was removed from YouTube and Vevo.

Track listing

Charts

Release history

2015 re-release

It was announced on 30 January 2015 that Smith would re-release "Lay Me Down" as the sixth single from their album In the Lonely Hour following commercial success with its previous singles. Smith recorded a new version of the song for its re-release with the track's original producers.

Music video
The music video for the re-release, which replaced the original, was recorded in St Margaret's Church, Lee, South East London, with the permission of the Rector the Revd. Dr. Alan Race. It was shot in one sequence. It depicts Smith at a funeral in the church standing in front of the deceased's coffin, then a flashback reveals that Smith actually married the man in question in the same church. The video then returns to the present day, some time after the funeral, with Smith mourning the loss of their husband in the empty church. Critics have pointed out the similarities between this and Guns N' Roses's music video to "November Rain".

Track listing

Charts and certifications

Weekly charts

Year-end charts

Certifications and sales

Release history

Red Nose Day 2015 release

On 9 March 2015, it was announced that Smith and John Legend had joined forces for a third version of "Lay Me Down" to be used as the official Red Nose Day charity single. This version was released the same day and all proceeds from the track's sales benefit the charity.

Smith sings the opening verse and first chorus with Legend on the piano, then Legend joins in with the second verse. Some later parts are a duet by the two artists.

Music video
Smith and Legend also appear in a new video for the charity. It was posted by Smith on their official Vevo account. The music video is also broadcast nationally on BBC One. The video features Smith and Legend recording the song in a recording studio.

Live performances
On 13 March 2015, Smith and Legend performed "Lay Me Down" together for the first and only time together during Comic Relief – Face the Funny, a major event broadcast live on BBC One from the London Palladium.

Charts

Weekly charts

Year-end charts

Certifications

|}

Release history

References

2012 songs
2013 singles
2015 singles
2010s ballads
Capitol Records singles
Comic Relief singles
Pop ballads
Sam Smith (singer) songs
Songs written by Jimmy Napes
LGBT-related songs
Soul ballads
Number-one singles in Scotland
UK Singles Chart number-one singles
Songs written by Sam Smith (singer)